Leptosiphon parviflorus (syn. Linanthus parviflorus) is a species of flowering plant in the phlox family known by the common name variable linanthus.

Distribution and habitat
It is widespread and common in many types of habitats, including chaparral, oak woodlands, mixed evergreen forests, and montane coniferous forests.

Mountain ranges it is found in include the Sierra Nevada, California Coast Ranges, Peninsular Ranges, southern Cascade Range, and Transverse Ranges. It is also native to four of the Channel Islands of California.

Description
Leptosiphon parviflorus is an annual herb. As its common name suggests, the plant is variable in appearance. The stem may be just a few centimeters long or up to 25 centimeters in erect height. The leaves are divided into several lobes, often linear in shape, and 1 to 2.5 centimeters long.

The inflorescence is a cluster of several flowers which may be nearly any color, often shades of yellow, pink, or white. Each flower has a long, very narrow tube which may exceed 3 centimeters. It expands into a yellowish throat and a flat corolla with purplish markings at the base of each lobe. The bloom period is March to June.

See also

References

External links
Calflora Database: Leptosiphon parviflorus (Variable linanthus)
Jepson Manual eFlora (TJM2) treatment ofLeptosiphon parviflorus
Leptosiphon parviflorus — U.C. Photo gallery

parviflorus
Endemic flora of California
Flora of the Sierra Nevada (United States)
Natural history of the California chaparral and woodlands
Natural history of the California Coast Ranges
Natural history of the Channel Islands of California
Natural history of the Peninsular Ranges
Natural history of the San Francisco Bay Area
Natural history of the Santa Monica Mountains
Natural history of the Transverse Ranges
Flora without expected TNC conservation status